A daith (pronounced ) piercing is an ear piercing that passes through the ear's innermost cartilage fold, the crus of the helix. 
 
The piercing is usually performed with a straight hollow needle. Captive bead rings are the most common jewellery type used. It can take from six to nine months for a daith piercing to heal.

History
A client of Erik Dakota, who is said to have been studying Hebrew in college, first named this piercing "da'at", meaning "knowledge". Her reasoning was that the piercer must have been very "smart" to figure out how to do the piercing. This piercing was first brought into the public eye in the early 1990s in Fakir Musafar's Body Play, in the same issue that also showcased the Industrial Piercing, the Apadydoe, and a large gauge conch piercing.

Fakir Musafar noted: "The Daith piercing was co-created in 1992 by Erik Dakota and a Jewish woman piercing client with a metaphysical bent. ... A true Daith must be done in such a way that the bottom part of the ring appears to come directly out of the ear canal. If one can see both the entrance and exit hole of the ring, it is not a true Daith. The technique for this piercing is quite advanced, requires a specifically curved needle and was devised by Erik Dakota."

The daith piercing has, in the past 20 years,  become a popular form of alternative medicine for the pain management associated with migraine. The belief has its roots in the Eastern medical practice of acupuncture. While some patients report a positive outcome from the piercing, there is no scientific evidence that it is a valid pain treatment, and any perceived efficacy could be ascribed to a placebo effect.

References

1992 introductions
Acupuncture
Ear piercing